Calliostoma haapaiense is a species of sea snail, a marine gastropod mollusk, in the family Calliostomatidae within the superfamily Trochoidea, the top snails, turban snails and their allies.

Distribution
This marine species occurs off in the Pacific Ocean off Tonga.

References

haapaiense